Jagati may refer to:

 A vedic meter
 Jagati (temple), a structural element in Indian architecture.
 Jagathy, a place in Kerala, India